The 2007 Florida State Seminoles football team represented Florida State University during the 2007 NCAA Division I FBS football season. The team was coached by Bobby Bowden and played their home games at Doak Campbell Stadium in Tallahassee, Florida. They were members of the Atlantic Coast Conference (ACC) and the Atlantic Division.

Florida State entered the 2007 season coming off a 2006 season that ended with an overall record of 7–6, which was head coach Bobby Bowden's worst since having a losing record in 1976, matching that mark in 2007. These wins were later vacated as punishment for violations of NCAA rules.

Preseason
The Seminoles were picked by the ACC media as the preseason favorite to win the ACC's Atlantic Division.

Tony Carter and Myron Rolle were named to the Thorpe Watch List

Greg Carr, Andre Fluellen, and Myron Rolle were named to the preseason All-ACC Team

Everette Brown, Jackie Claude, Geno Hayes, and Myron Rolle were named to the Preseason All-ACC Second-Team by Athlon Magazine

Greg Carr was named to the Maxwell Award watch list

Andre Fluellen, Tony Carter, and Myron Rolle were named to the Bednarik Award watch list.

Andre Fluellen was named to the Outland Trophy watch list

Tony Carter was named All-ACC Second-Team by The Sporting News and Rivals.com

Mid-season awards
Myron Rolle was named to the CoSIDA Academic All-District Team

Gary Cismesia was named as a semifinalist for the Lou Groza Award

Postseason awards

Schedule

Recruits

Starting lineup

Offense
Offensive Coordinator/ Quarterbacks Coach: Jimbo Fisher (1st year)

Defense
Associate Head Coach/ Defensive Coordinator: Mickey Andrews (24th year)
Base Defense: 4–3 Multiple

Special teams

Injured players

Other coaches
Executive Head Coach/ Linebackers – Chuck Amato
Assistant Head Coach/ Offensive Line – Rick Trickett
Defensive Ends/ Special Teams Coordinator – Jody Allen
Tight Ends/ Recruiting Coordinator – John Lilly
Wide Receivers – Lawrence Dawsey
Running Backs – Dexter Carter
Defensive Tackles – Odell Haggins
Strength and Conditioning – Todd Stroud
Graduate Assistant/ Defense – James Colzie
Graduate Assistant/ Defensive Backs – Terrell Buckley

Game capsules
The records in parenthesis indicates the opposing team's record at the time Florida State played them, NOT Florida State's record.

Clemson
Pregame Line: FSU −3.5

Florida State's terrible first half on both sides of the ball lead to a 24–3 deficit. The Seminoles made adjustments at halftime and swung the momentum in their direction holding Clemson to just 46 yards in the 2nd half. FSU had 196 2nd half yards led by Running Back, Antone Smith. Drew Weatherford and the Seminole offense couldn't shake the Clemson pressure in the second-to-last drive of the game, getting to the Clemson 30-yard line, but falling short of the end zone.

2 bomb threats for a building on campus (not the stadium) were emailed to Clemson University Police. As a precaution, extra security was at the stadium.
Ann Bowden, wife to Bobby (FSU Head Coach) and mother to Tommy (Clemson Head Coach), was not in attendance.
Florida State Safety, Mister Alexander, tore his ACL during the game and will be out for the rest of the season.
Clemson jumped from 41 to 25 in the AP Poll and from 35 to 26 in the USA Today Coaches Poll.
FSU fell from 19 to 36 in the AP Poll and fell from 21 to 38 in the USA Today Coaches Poll.

UAB
Pregame Line: FSU −34.5

The Seminoles got off to another slow start. On Florida State's first drive, Drew Weatherford threw his first interception in 70-plus attempts and it was returned for a touchdown to put UAB up 7–0. The Seminoles scored 21 points in the third quarter to overcome a 17–3 deficit. They won the game, 34–24.
Antone Smith left the game with a concussion.
Florida State dropped from the USA Today Coaches Poll.
 Florida State jumped from 36 to 35 in the AP Poll.

Colorado
Pregame Line: FSU −6

The game was mostly a defensive struggle. Late in the 1st quarter, Antone Smith broke away for a 36-yard touchdown run.  For the rest of the game, Florida State's offense could not score, even when, at one point, their starting field position was at the Colorado 15-yard line.  Instead, they had to settle for three field goals by Gary Cismesia.  With 3:40 remaining in the game, Colorado scored a touchdown on a 4th-and-10 play from the Florida State 11-yard line.  However, the 2-point conversion attempt failed, and the Seminoles recovered the ensuing onside kick to preserve the victory.

Alabama

    
    
    
    
    

The game got off to another very slow start. It was another first half full of defense. In the 2nd quarter, an ineffective Drew Weatherford was pulled for Xavier Lee. After a halftime score of 0–0, Lee led a strong drive to put FSU up 7–0. After a forced fumble by Everette Brown, a toss sweep to Antone Smith put FSU up 14–0. Alabama's offense took advantage of FSU's prevent defense to score a TD to make it 14–7. Lee then hit Decody Fagg on a 75-yard pass to put FSU up 21–7. Alabama scored late to make it 21–14, but FSU recovered the onside kick, and held on for a 21–14 win.

NC State
Pregame Line:

Xavier Lee, making his first start of the season at quarterback, ran 2 yards for the Seminoles' first touchdown 2:11 into the game, three plays after a 58-yard pass to Greg Carr on the game's first play.  Although N.C. State (1–5, 0–3 ACC) led 10–7 in the first quarter, it was again plagued by four turnovers—boosting its number to 21 in coach Tom O'Brien's first year at the school.  Michael Ray Garvin returned an interception 43 yards for a touchdown to spark Florida State's scoring.  Garvin, a track All-American who finished sixth in the 100 meters at the NCAA finals and ran a leg on Florida State's championship 400-meter relay team, gave Florida State a 17–10 lead early in the third quarter with his first interception of the season.  The game was delayed late in the third quarter for 49 minutes because of a lightning threat.  Greg Carr caught a 40-yard touchdown pass early in the fourth quarter to give the Seminoles a 24–10 lead.  Daniel Evans was intercepted three times Saturday—once at the end of the half that killed a Wolfpack drive that had reached Florida State's 26.  It was the first game against North Carolina State for former Wolfpack coach Chuck Amato, who returned to Florida State to be an assistant after getting fired by N.C. State after last season.  The Seminoles snapped a string of eight straight losses against Atlantic Division rivals. N.C. State has now lost a dozen straight game against Bowl Subdivision (formerly I-A) schools.

Wake Forest
Pregame Line: FSU −4.5

Wake Forest's defense in the first half allowed two big plays that set up the Seminoles' two scoring drives, then shut them down after halftime.  Wake Forest moved 80 yards in nine plays late in the third quarter to force a 14–14 tie – a drive that started when Alphonso Smith intercepted Lee in the end zone.  Skinner capped the drive with a nifty play in which he faked a handoff to Adams, deked like he would roll right and instead reversed field and flipped to the wide-open tailback for a 6-yard score.    The Demon Deacons forced five second-half punts, intercepted two passes and allowed 105 total yards after the break – with a good chunk coming after Swank's late kick.  Florida State's rushing offense never could get going, finishing with 47 yards on 24 carries.  Riley Skinner's 35-yard touchdown pass to Kenneth Moore in the fourth quarter led the Demon Deacons past Florida State 24–21 and helped the sophomore quarterback improve to 2–0 against his home state school that didn't recruit him.  Skinner led the Demon Deacons 82 yards in nine plays, converting three third downs during their game-winning drive. The biggest came when Skinner sidestepped a pass rush, stepped forward in the pocket and found Moore, who had a step on cornerback Jamie Robinson at the goal line, for the easy score that put Wake Forest up 21–14 with 6:41 remaining.  Florida State gave the ball right back to Wake Forest on the first play of its ensuing drive, when Chip Vaughn intercepted Xavier Lee's deep pass at the 26. The Demon Deacons milked the clock and set up Sam Swank's 48-yard field goal with 1:40 to play that made it a 10-point game.  Lee scored on a 17-yard run with 17 seconds left to draw the Seminoles within three, but Wake Forest recovered an onside kick to seal it.  The defending league champs rallied in the second half to follow up last year's stunning 30–0 rout in Tallahassee by claiming the first consecutive wins over the Seminoles (4–2, 1–2) in school history.

Miami
Pregame Line: FSU −5

Florida State and Miami both entered this game unranked for the first time since 1977. The teams exchanged turnovers (nine total, five by FSU) and scores, keeping things close for most of the game. With 5:29 left in the fourth quarter, the Hurricanes, trailing 29–24, appeared to have lost their best chance to win when Kirby Freeman was stopped for no gain on a fourth-and-1 at the Florida State 1. But Freeman, who replaced injured Kyle Wright in the first half, drove Miami 83 yards in under two minutes to take the lead 30–29 on a 13-yard pass to Dedrick Epps with 1:15 left.  FSU quarterback Xavier Lee, who was intercepted twice, then fumbled after being hit by Miami's Teraz McCray, and Colin McCarthy ran it in for the clincher.  This was the first game since 2001 that was decided by more than a touchdown.

Duke
Pregame Line:

Florida State led 9–0 at halftime on three field goals by Gary Cismesia.  After going more than five quarters without an offensive touchdown, the Seminoles made it to the end zone six minutes into the third quarter when Parker raced 9 yards with a short sideline pass from Drew Weatherford, giving Florida State a 16–0 lead.  Parker scored his second TD late in the third quarter on a 14-yard run to make the score 22–0.  After Cismesia kicked his fourth field goal, Duke (1–7, 0–5 ACC) avoided a shutout when Thaddeus Lewis lofted a 3-yard pass to a wide-open Brandon King in the right front corner of the end zone with 8:07 left.  Florida State (5–3, 2–3 ACC) rolled up a season-high 534 yards and 30 first downs while holding Duke to 222 yards and 9 first downs. The Blue Devils managed only 49 yards and two first downs in the first half.  Patrick Robinson had an interception for the fourth straight game.  Florida State ended a two-game losing streak with a 25–6 victory over Duke, handing the Blue Devils' their 22nd straight Atlantic Coast Conference loss.

#2 Boston College
Pregame Line: FSU +7½

The game began in a frigid and soaking downpour, with wind gusts forecast at up to 50 mph as the remnants of Hurricane Noel proceeded up the East Coast. The rain had stopped by the end of the first quarter, but the winds battered the U.S. flag and played havoc with a couple of second-quarter field goal attempts.  Drew Weatherford completed 29-of-45 passes for 354 yards for Florida State (6–3, 3–3), hitting Preston Parker nine times for 93 yards and a touchdown and De'Cody Fagg on six catches for 111 yards and a TD.  Matt Ryan finished 25-for-53 for two touchdowns and 415 yards—his fourth career 400-yard game, tying Doug Flutie for the most in school history, but his interceptions were costly.  Ryan was picked off once in the first quarter inside the Seminoles 10 by Patrick Robinson, making this his fifth consecutive game recovering an interception.  Ryan also threw an interception early in the third that allowed Florida State to move into position for a 40-yard field goal that made it 10–0.  Ryan led BC on a four-play, 70-yard drive over 63 seconds, hitting Ryan Purvis for 26 yards to the Florida State 30, and then Brandon Robinson for the touchdown.  The teams traded field goals, then Weatherford hit Fagg on a 42-yard touchdown pass to give the Seminoles a 20–10 lead.  Ryan hit Rich Gunnell on a 42-yard pass to the Florida State 6 with 7:24 left. Two plays later, including a penalty that moved the ball to the 3, Ryan hit a wide-open Purvis in the middle of the end zone to make it 20–17.  BC forced a punt and got the ball back at its own 7 with 3:30 left and a chance to take the lead.  Ryan moved the Eagles out to the 33 before Hayes ripped the ball free from Purvis on a pass across the middle.  Geno Hayes returned Matt Ryan's third interception for a 38-yard touchdown with 1:10 to play to help Florida State beat second-ranked Boston College 27–17, ending the Eagles' run at an unbeaten season.

#11 Virginia Tech
Pregame Line: FSU +6½

Christian Ponder had a solid showing after taking over for the injured Drew Weatherford, until the 4th quarter when he lost a fumble and threw two consecutive interceptions, which sealed the loss for the Seminoles.  Emergency quarterback D'Vontrey Richardson came in for just one snap late in the 4th and was brought down in the endzone for a safety.

Maryland
Pregame Line: FSU −7½

#14 Florida
Pregame Line: FSU +14.5

Music City Bowl vs. Kentucky

Pregame Line:

The Seminoles entered the game without 34 players due to a various injuries, violating of team rules, and a large academic cheating scandal.

In September 2011 it was revealed through and interview in USA Today, Bowden had been diagnosed and treated for prostate cancer in 2007.

References

Florida State
Florida State Seminoles football seasons
Florida State Seminoles football